Way Up is the debut extended play by South Korean boy group TNX. It was released by P Nation on May 17, 2022, and contains five tracks, including the lead single "Move".

Background and release
On March 29, 2022, it was announced the group would be officially called TNX (The New Six), and they made their official debut on May 17. On April 25, it was announced that the group would debut with the release of their debut EP Way Up.

Track listing

Charts

References

2022 debut EPs
Korean-language EPs